The 1951 Paris–Roubaix was the 49th edition of the Paris–Roubaix, a classic one-day cycle race in France. The single day event was held on 8 April 1951 and stretched  from Paris to the finish at Roubaix Velodrome. The winner was Antonio Bevilacqua from Italy.

Results

References

Paris–Roubaix
Paris-Roubaix
Paris-Roubaix
Paris-Roubaix
Paris-Roubaix